George William Henry Bates (5 January 1914 – 1 April 1983) was an Australian rules footballer who played with Collingwood, Richmond and South Melbourne in the Victorian Football League (VFL).

Bates returned to his original club, Northcote, after just once season at Collingwood. He was a centre half-back in Northcote's 1934 premiership team and had a starring role in another premiership two years later. He resumed his VFL career in 1937 and made 14 appearances that year, including a semi final. After two more seasons with Richmond, Bates made his way to South Melbourne in 1940.

References

1914 births
1983 deaths
Australian rules footballers from Melbourne
Collingwood Football Club players
Richmond Football Club players
Sydney Swans players
Northcote Football Club players
People from Abbotsford, Victoria